The Wolverines were an Australian country rock band formed in 1994 from Tamworth, New South Wales by Darcy Leyear (guitar and vocals), John Clinton (drums and vocals), and Chris Doyle (keyboard and vocals). The band were active between 1994 and 2012 and were known by some as "The Bad Boys of Country."

About
The Wolverines started in Australia in 1994 and said an encyclopaedia's description of a wolverine being "a short- snouted, blunt-headed, long- haired, heavy-set, nocturnal, eat- anything, almost-extinct animal viewed by some people as a pest." was the inspiration for their name.

Some of their songs have crass and sexual lyrics while others are heartfelt tributes. One of their hit songs, "65 Roses" written by Lee J. Collier, tells the story of a small boy who could not pronounce Cystic Fibrosis, the condition which afflicted his sister and his entire family. The original version of the song is a 3/4 country waltz format, The Wolverines changed the song into a 4/4 country rock version to suit the band's style. Lee J. Collier has 100% copyright on both versions. The Wolverines recorded their version of Lee J. Collier's song to raise awareness and research funds for CF with a percentage of all sales being donated to the association.

They performed at shows and festivals throughout Australia and the world, including 40,000 at the Gympie Muster, 10,000 kids at Tamworth Kids Charity Concert, participated in the Australian April Middle East Tour de Force in 2007 and 2008 and played for American Marines in Okinawa, Japan.

“The band has such an amazing ability to bond with their audience. Their tongue in cheek humour and dedication to make music fun really connects them to their fan base." One Stop Country manager, Katania Young

Fundraising

Sail for Kids

In July 2003, The Wolverines sailed from Sydney to Whitsundays, stopping and playing at 14 ports, including Airlie Beach and Hamilton Island, along the way in their "The Wolverines Sail for CF Kids" tour, sponsored by LJ Hooker, fundraising for cystic fibrosis research. They concluded the tour having raised more than $35,000 and leaving it with the communities in which they had performed.

In 2007, The Wolverines repeated their "Wolverines Sail for Kids" from Sydney, up the coast to Cairns, ending at Silkwood in Far North Queensland. They anticipated stopping and playing at "all ports in between" to raise awareness and funds for less fortunate children along the coast. Starting on Friday, 6 July 2007 at the Cruising Yacht Club of Australia in Rushcutters Bay, Sydney, they sailed a 52-foot Beneteau north.  Before each gig they gave a few disadvantaged children the opportunity to sail. At each stop, The Wolverines conducted a short auction to raise funds for a needy child or a local children's charity. One item regularly for auction was a signed, limited edition canvas print. They have also participated in the Tamworth Kids Charity Concert and Cystic Fibrosis Ball.

Discography

Albums

Charting singles

Awards

Country Music Awards of Australia
The Country Music Awards of Australia (CMAA) (also known as the Golden Guitar Awards) is an annual awards night held in January during the Tamworth Country Music Festival, celebrating recording excellence in the Australian country music industry. They have been held annually since 1973.
 (wins only)
|-
| 2002
| Wolverines - "65 Roses"
| Vocal Group or Duo of the Year
|

Mo Awards
The Australian Entertainment Mo Awards (commonly known informally as the Mo Awards), were annual Australian entertainment industry awards. They recognise achievements in live entertainment in Australia from 1975 to 2016. The Wolverines won four awards in that time.
 (wins only)
|-
| 2001
| The Wolverines
| Country Group of the Year
| 
|-
| 2002
| The Wolverines
| Country Group of the Year
| 
|-
| 2003
| The Wolverines
| Country Group of the Year
| 
|-
| 2007
| The Wolverines
| Country Group of the Year
| 
|-

References

Bush, Greg; TAKING CARE OF BUSINESS; Capital News, April 2006 Vol 31 No 4

External links
The Wolverines, Official Website (last archive version before domain lapsed)
The Wolverines Facebook Page

Australian country music groups
Australian country rock groups
New South Wales musical groups